Norman Ware (5 March 1911 – 26 August 2003) was an Australian rules footballer in the Victorian Football League (VFL).

A scrupulously fair, clever and unusually pacy ruckman for Footscray, Ware is the only captain-coach to have won the Brownlow Medal, and is likely to remain so indefinitely, as it would be almost impossible for a captain of an AFL team to act as a coach today, and even so, playing coaches are prohibited under salary cap regulations (instituted in 1987) in order to prevent wealthier clubs from circumventing the restrictions of the salary cap and salary floor.

He was recruited from Sale. His brother Wally played for Hawthorn.

In 2001 Ware was inducted into the Australian Football Hall of Fame.

Career highlights 
 Brownlow Medal: 1941
 Footscray Best and Fairest: 1934, 1937, 1938, 1940, 1941, 1942
 Footscray captain: 1940
 Footscray Team of the Century
 Victorian representative (10 games, 6 goals)

References

External links

 
 Australian Football Hall of Fame

1911 births
2003 deaths
Western Bulldogs players
Western Bulldogs coaches
Australian Football Hall of Fame inductees
Brownlow Medal winners
Charles Sutton Medal winners
Australian rules footballers from Victoria (Australia)
Sale Football Club players
People from Sale, Victoria